Paris L. Horne (born August 6, 1987) is an American professional basketball player who last played for Kouvot of the Finnish Korisliiga. Horne played college basketball at St. John's University. He has played for BG Gottingen in Germany and competed at the FIBA EuroChallenge 2012 (6 games and 10.7 ppg).

The Basketball Tournament 
Horne has competed for Overseas Elite in The Basketball Tournament (TBT), a single-elimination winner-take-all tournament held annually since 2014 in the United States. He was a point guard on the 2015 team which won TBT's $1 million prize. Horne was also a part of the 2016, 2017, and 2018 iterations of Overseas Elite, each of which took home a $2 million prize.

In 2016, Horne averaged 5.8 points per game (PPG) as well as 1.7 assists per game (APG) and 1.2 steals per game. In 2017, Horne averaged 2.8 PPG.  In TBT 2018, Horne played six games. He averaged 4.2 PPG and 2.0 rebounds per game while shooting 59%. Overseas Elite reached the championship game and played Eberlein Drive, winning 70–58 for their fourth consecutive TBT title. In TBT 2019, Horne was the team's general manager and assistant coach. The team advanced to the semifinals, where they suffered their first-ever defeat, losing to Carmen's Crew, 71–66.

References

External links 
Profile at Eurobasket.com

1987 births
Living people
American expatriate basketball people in Finland
American expatriate basketball people in Germany
American expatriate basketball people in Greece
American expatriate basketball people in Turkey
American men's basketball players
Basketball players from Philadelphia
BG Göttingen players
Büyükçekmece Basketbol players
Kouvot players
Rethymno B.C. players
Shooting guards
St. John's Red Storm men's basketball players